Haugan (also Waugan) is an unincorporated community in Mineral County, Montana, United States. The St. Regis River flows through the community.

Demographics

History
Haugan was named for H. G. Haugan, Land Commissioner of the Chicago, Milwaukee & St. Paul Railway. Haugan was established and maintained to serve as a pusher station for the Milwaukee Road railroad trains ascending the Bitterroot Range of the Rocky Mountains.

Haugan was one of several area towns to be destroyed during the Great Fire of 1910. Haugan had a post office for nearly seventy years in the twentieth century. Opened on March 25, 1911, the post office closed on August 31, 1944, only to reopen four years later.  This second post office operated from June 16, 1948 to July 22, 1983.

Nearby
Haugan is surrounded by the Lolo National Forest and is the site of the Savenac Nursery Historic District. The nearby Haugan/Randolph Creek Loop Snowmobile Trail offers cross-country skiing, snowmobiling and other winter sport. Also nearby is the summit of Haugan Mountain.

The community is most commonly known for its Silver Dollars tourist area. Billboards and signs telling drivers the distance are seen on Interstate 90 around Western Montana and Northern Idaho.

References

Further reading
Lutz, Dennis J.  Montana Post Offices and Postmasters  Rochester: Johnson, 1986.
Pyne, Stephen J.  Year of the Fires: The Story of the Great Fires of 1910.  Missoula: Mountain, 2008.

External links
Milwaukee Road Historical Association
Haugan/Randolph Creek Loop Snowmobile Trail. Haugan, MT
About Beautiful Haugan, MT
Mineral County Chamber of Commerce
The Milwaukee Road Rocky Mountain Division
CMSP&P Haugan, MT

Unincorporated communities in Mineral County, Montana
Unincorporated communities in Montana